Ubu and the Great Gidouille (Ubu et la Grande Gidouille) is a 1979 French animated film directed by Jan Lenica. It is based on Alfred Jarry's play Ubu Roi. The film was re-released on 11 November 1987 in France. Michel Poujade (voice of Père Ubu) and Janine Grillon (voice of Mère Ubu) were the main actors. Les Films Armorial was the production company of the film.

References

 

1979 films
1979 animated films
1970s French animated films
French animated films
1970s stop-motion animated films
1970s French films